Zahid Hussain (born 18 February 1940), better known by the pen name Wasim Barelvi, is an Indian Urdu-language poet. He was born in Bareilly, Uttar Pradesh. His ghazals, many sung by Jagjit Singh, are very popular. He has been awarded with the "Firaq Gorakhpuri International Award", the Kalidas gold medal (by the Haryana government, in recognition for his services in the field of Urdu and Hindi poetry); the Begum Akhtar Kala Dharmi award; and the Naseem-e-Urdu award. 
Barelvi is Vice Chairman of the National Council for Promotion of Urdu Language (NCPUL). He has also  performed at Culrav 2012 (the cultural event of NIT Allahabad). He is also Member of Legislative Council of Uttar Pradesh since 2016.

Selected works 
 
Tabassum-e-Gham (Urdu) (1966)
 Aansu Mere Daman Tera (Hindi) (1990)
 Mizaj (Urdu) (1990)
 Aankh Aansu Hui (Urdu) (2000)
 Mera kya (Hindi) (2000)
 Aankhon Aankhon Rahe (Urdu) (2007)
 Mera kya (Urdu) (2007)
 Mausam Andar Bahar Ke (Urdu) (2007)
 Charagh (Devnagri) (2016)

References

Urdu-language poets from India
Living people
1940 births
People from Bareilly
20th-century Indian Muslims
21st-century Indian Muslims
Indian male poets